Bevier Township is a township in Macon County, in the U.S. state of Missouri.

Bevier Township takes its name from Col. Robert Bevier, who afterward became a leader of the Confederate army.

References

Townships in Missouri
Townships in Macon County, Missouri